Events in the year 2022 in Grenada.

Incumbents 

 Monarch: Elizabeth II (until September 8); then Charles III 
 Governor-General: Dame Cécile La Grenade
 Prime Minister: Keith Mitchell (until 24 June); Dickon Mitchell onwards

Events 
Ongoing — COVID-19 pandemic in Grenada

 January 1 –  2022 New Year Honours
 June 23 – 2022 Grenadian general election: Citizens of Grenada head to the polls to vote in a general election.
 June 24 – The oppositional National Democratic Congress wins the majority of seats in Grenada's latest general election. NDC's party leader Dickon Mitchell becomes Grenada's next Prime Minister.
 September 8 – Accession of Charles III as King of Grenada following the death of Queen Elizabeth II.
 September 12 – Charles III is officially proclaimed King of Grenada by the Governor-General at Government House in St. George's.
 September 19 – The Governor-General attends the Queen's state funeral in the United Kingdom.
 September 25 – A special commemorative service takes place at the St. George's Anglican Church to mark the passing of Elizabeth II, Queen of Grenada.

Deaths 

 January 1 – Mighty Bomber, 93, calypsonian
 September 8 – Elizabeth II, 96, Queen of Grenada
 September 24 – Hudson Austin, 84, military officer, chairman of the Revolutionary Military Council (1983)

References 

 
2020s in Grenada
Years of the 21st century in Grenada
Grenada
Grenada